

Barbeau Peak is a mountain in Qikiqtaaluk, Nunavut, Canada. Located on Ellesmere Island within Quttinirpaaq National Park, it is the highest mountain in Nunavut and the Canadian Arctic. The mountain was named in 1969 after Marius Barbeau, a Canadian anthropologist whose research into First Nations and Inuit cultures gained him international acclaim.

Barbeau Peak is characterized by deep and long crevasses, razor thin ridges and highly variable and volatile weather.

Barbeau Peak is the highest mountain within the British Empire Range as well as the Arctic Cordillera, as well as in all of eastern North America.

Barbeau Peak was first climbed on 7 June 1967 by British geologist/glaciologist Geoffrey Hattersley-Smith as part of a joint Defence Research Board/Royal Air Force field party. The party both named the peak and determined its height.

The second ascent was by an eight-man American team in June 1982 (Errington, Trafton AAC 1983) via the north ridge. Subsequent ascents have been made in 1992, 1998, 2000 and 2002, though as of 2006 only seven successful summits have been attained.

See also
List of highest points of Canadian provinces and territories
Mountain peaks of Canada
List of Ultras of Canada

Further reading

References

Geographical Names of the Ellesmere Island National Park Reserve and Vicinity by Geoffrey Hattersley-Smith (1998)

External links
 Barbeau Peak at SummitPost
 "Barbeau Peak, Nunavut" on Peakbagger

British Empire Range
Mountains of Qikiqtaaluk Region
Ellesmere Island
Two-thousanders of Nunavut